Montfortia hermosa is a species of sea snail, a marine gastropod mollusk in the family Fissurellidae, the keyhole limpets and slit limpets.

Description
The shell grows to a size of 7 mm.

Distribution
This marine species occurs in the Gulf of California, Mexico.

References

External links
 To World Register of Marine Species
 

Fissurellidae
Gastropods described in 1935